Juan Estuardo Maegli Novella (born 15 April 1958) is a Guatemalan sailor. He competed at the 1976 Summer Olympics, the 1980 Summer Olympics, and the 1984 Summer Olympics.

His son Juan Ignacio Maegli was also an Olympic sailor for Guatemala.

References

External links
 
 

1958 births
Living people
Guatemalan male sailors (sport)
Olympic sailors of Guatemala
Sailors at the 1976 Summer Olympics – 470
Sailors at the 1980 Summer Olympics – Finn
Sailors at the 1984 Summer Olympics – Finn
Place of birth missing (living people)